The 2011–12 B Group was the 57th season of the Bulgarian B Football Group, the second tier of the Bulgarian football league system. The season started on 13 August 2011 and finished in June 2012 with the A Group promotion play-off.

On 9 June the Executive Committee of Bulgarian Football Union decided to reduce further the number of teams in both West and East B PFG due licensing problems in most of the clubs. The new format consisted of ten teams in each group playing three times against all the others during the season. There were no draws for the matches between fixture 19 and fixture 27. The program was issued depending the position of each club after the completion of fixture 18.

Like in the previous season, the A Group promotion play-off was played in two stages. The first was the match between the runners-up from the West and East B PFG. The final stage was played between the 14th finished team from A Group and the winner from the first stage.

Team changes from 2010–11

Movement between A PFG and B PFG

The champions of the two groups of B PFG were promoted to A PFG. These were Botev (Vratsa) (West B PFG champions) and Ludogorets Razgrad (East B PFG champions). The third promoted team is Svetkavitsa, which won the promotion play-off against Etar (Veliko Tarnovo).

Akademik (Sofia) and Sliven were directly relegated from A PFG after finishing in the bottom two places. The team that finished 14th in A PFG - Vidima-Rakovski (Sevlievo) lost the promotion/relegation play-off against Chernomorets (Pomorie), but Chernomorets did not receive a license for A PFG, so Vidima-Rakovski retained its place. The third relegated team is Pirin (Blagoevgrad), finished 13th, because it filed bankruptcy. Pirin did not even receive license for B PFG, so the team will participate in V AFG.

Movement between B PFG and V AFG

In different stages Chernomorets (Balchik), Dunav (Ruse) and Ravda decided to cancel their participation in the East B PFG and were relegated from the group. Additionally the teams of Spartak (Plovdiv) and Brestnik 1948 (Plovdiv) declared not being ready to fulfill the license regulations and voluntarily were relegated to V AFG. In place of those five teams came the third league champions Botev (Plovdiv) (South-East), Spartak (Varna) (North-East) and the winner of the promotion play-off Neftochimic 1986 (Burgas). Further the team of Etar (Veliko Tarnovo) was moved from West to East B PFG so that the league had ten participating teams.

The situation in the West B PFG was much more clearer. Kom-Minyor left the competition during the winter break due financial difficulties, Botev (Krivodol) was relegated after finishing in 11th place and Vihren (Sandanski) voluntarily left after the end of the season. Those teams were replaced with the V AFG champions - Slivnishki Geroi (Slivnitsa) (South-West) and Bdin (Vidin) (North-West).

East B Group

Stadia and locations

League table

West B Group

Stadia and locations

League table

Promotion play-off

References 

2011-12
Bul
2